Cypress Hill is the debut studio album by the American hip hop group Cypress Hill. It was released on August 13, 1991 by Ruffhouse Records and Columbia Records. Recording sessions for the album were held at Image Recording Studios in Los Angeles from August 1990 to May 1991. The production of the album was handled by DJ Muggs. The album was critically and commercially successful proving to be a major success for the group. Receiving major air-play on urban radio and college radio helped the albums popularity. The album went Double platinum in the U.S. with over 2 million units sold. The album is broken down track-by-track by Cypress Hill in Brian Coleman's book Check the Technique published in 2007, 16 years after the album release.

Reception

Steve Huey of AllMusic calls Cypress Hill's debut "a sonic blueprint that would become one of the most widely copied in hip-hop."

In 1998, the album was selected as one of The Source's 100 Best Rap Albums. The album was included in the book 1001 Albums You Must Hear Before You Die.

Rolling Stone called it "an album that is innovative and engaging in spite of its hard-core messages."

 Included in Rolling Stones "Essential Recordings of the 90's".
 Ranked #57 in Spin Magazines "90 Greatest Albums of the '90s".
 Included in Q Magazines "90 Best Albums Of The 1990s".

Track listing 
All tracks produced by DJ Muggs.

Personnel
 B-Real – Vocals
 Sen Dog – Vocals
 DJ Muggs – Arranger, Producer, Mixing
 Joe Nicolo – Engineer, Executive Producer, Mixing
 Jason Roberts – Engineer
 Chris Schwartz – Executive Producer
 Howie Weinberg – Mastering
 Ponch – percussions
 Photography - Mike Miller

Charts

Weekly charts

Singles

Certifications

References

External links

Cypress Hill albums
1991 debut albums
Albums produced by DJ Muggs
Ruffhouse Records albums
Columbia Records albums
Hip hop albums by American artists